Musoma Urban District is one of the seven districts of Mara Region of Tanzania. Its capital  is the town of Musoma. The district is bordered to the north by Lake Victoria and to the south by Butiama District.

According to the 2012 Tanzania National Census, the population of the Musoma Urban District was 134,327.

Transport
Paved trunk road T17 connects Musoma Urban District with Butiama District.

Administrative subdivisions
As of 2012, Musoma Urban District was administratively divided into 13 wards.

Wards

 Buhare
 Bweri
 Iringo
 Kamunyonge
 Kigera
 Kitaji
 Makoko
 Mukendo
 Mwigobero
 Mwisenge
 Nyakato
 Nyamatare
 Nyasho

References

Districts of Mara Region